Smolensk is a city in Russia.

Smolensk may also refer to:

A former name of Livingston Island
Smolensk Strait in the South Shetland Islands, Antarctica 
Smolensk air disaster, a 2010 plane crash 
Smolensk (film), about the plane crash
Smolensk, former name of the football club SFC CRFSO Smolensk

Ships

 (1926-1941)
, a number of steamships named Smolensk

See also
Diocese of Smolensk (disambiguation)
Smolensk Governorate
Smolensk Oblast
Smolensk Principality
Smolensk Province
Smolensk Upland
Smolensk Voivodeship